This is a list of streams in the U.S. State of Colorado.


Alphabetical list
The following alphabetical list includes many important streams that flow through the State of Colorado, including all 158 named rivers.  Where available, the total extent of the stream's drainage basin is shown after the name.  The names of the 17 Colorado rivers with a drainage basin of more than 10,000 square kilometers (3,900 sq mi), about three times the area of Rhode Island, are shown in bold.
Adams Fork Conejos River
Alamosa River 383 km2 (148 mi2)
Animas River 3,562 km2 (1,375 mi2)
Apishapa River 2,798 km2 (1,080 mi2)
Arikaree River 4,429 km2 (1,710 mi2)
Arkansas River 478,501 km2 (184,750 mi2)
Aspen Brook
Bear Creek 4,500 km2 (1,737 mi2)
Bear Creek 339 km2 (131 mi2)
Bear River
Beaver Creek 2,939 km2 (1,135 mi2)
Big Dry Creek (Littleton, Colorado)
Big Dry Creek (Westminster, Colorado)
Big Sandy Creek 4,825 km2 (1,863 mi2)
Big Thompson River 2,149 km2 (830 mi2)
Bijou Creek 3,612 km2 (1,395 mi2)
Blue Creek
Blue River 1,770 km2 (683 mi2)
Box Elder Creek
Boulder Creek (1,160 km2 (448 mi2)
Cache la Poudre River 4,959 km2 (1,915 mi2)
Canadian River 122,701 km2 (47,375 mi2)
Canadian River
Cebolla Creek
Chalk Creek
Cherry Creek 1,050 km2 (405 mi2)
Chico Creek 1,934 km2 (747 mi2)
Cimarron River 44,890 km2 (17,332 mi2)
Cimarron River
Clear Creek 1,497 km2 (578 mi2)
Cochetopa Creek
Colorado River(637,137 km2 (246,000 mi2)
Conejos River 2,078 km2 (802 mi2)
Crow Creek 3,717 km2 (1,435 mi2)
Crystal River
Cucharas River
Culebra Creek
Dolores River 11,998 km2 (4,633 mi2)
Dry Fork Michigan River
Eagle River 2,515 km2 (971 mi2)
East Fork Arkansas River
East Fork Cimarron River
East Fork Eagle River
East Fork Little Cimarron River
East Fork Navajo River
East Fork Piedra River
East Fork Rio Chama
East Fork San Juan River
East Fork South Fork Crystal River
East Fork Williams Fork
East Mancos River
East River 762 km2 (294 mi2)
Elk River
Encampment River
Fall River
Fall River
First Fork Piedra River
First Fork South Fork Piney River
Florida River
Fountain Creek 2,418 km2 (933 mi2)
Fraser River
Frenchman Creek 7,398 km2 (2,856 mi2)
Fryingpan River
Geneva Creek
Gore Creek
Grape Creek
Green River (115,903 km2 (44,750 mi2)
Gunnison River (20,851 km2 (8,051 mi2)
Henson Creek
Hermosa Creek
Hidden River
Hill Branch Cucharas River
Horse Creek 3,680 km2 (1,421 mi2)
Huerfano River 4,840 km2 (1,869 mi2)
Illinois River
Kettle Creek
Kiowa Creek 1,888 km2 (729 mi2)
La Plata River
Ladder Creek 3,645 km2 (1,407 mi2)
Lake Fork Gunnison River
Laramie River 11,961 km2 (4,618 mi2)
Left Hand Creek
Little Beaver Creek 1,602 km2 (619 mi2)
Little Cimarron River
Little Dolores River
Little Dry Creek
Little Navajo River
Little Snake River 10,629 km2 (4,104 mi2)
Little Thompson River
Lodgepole Creek 8,374 km2 (3,233 mi2)
Lone Tree Creek
Los Pinos River
Mancos River 2,099 km2 (810 mi2)
McElmo Creek 1,842 km2 (711 mi2)
Michigan River
Middle Fork Cimarron River
Middle Fork Conejos River
Middle Fork Elk River
Middle Fork Little Snake River
Middle Fork Piedra River
Middle Fork Purgatoire River
Middle Fork South Arkansas River
Middle Fork South Platte River
Middle Fork Swan River
Middle Mancos River
Montezuma Creek 3,044 km2 (1,175 mi2)
Muddy Creek
Navajo River
North Branch Conejos River
North Fork Animas River
North Fork Apishapa River
North Fork Arikaree River
North Fork Big Thompson River
North Fork Cache la Poudre River
North Fork Canadian River
North Fork Cimarron River 4,462 km2 (1,723 mi2)
North Fork Conejos River
North Fork Crystal River
North Fork Elk River
North Fork Fryingpan River
North Fork Gunnison River 2,492 km2 (962 mi2)
North Fork Little Snake River
North Fork Little Thompson River
North Fork Los Pinos River
North Fork Michigan River
North Fork North Platte River
North Fork Piney River
North Fork Purgatoire River
North Fork Republican River 13,172 km2 (5,086 mi2)
North Fork Rio de los Piños
North Fork Smoky Hill River 1,965 km2 (759 mi2)
North Fork Snake River
North Fork South Arkansas River
North Fork South Platte River
North Fork Swan River
North Fork Vermejo River
North Fork West Branch Laramie River
North Fork West Mancos River
North Fork White River
North Platte River 80,755 km2 (31,180 mi2)
North Saint Charles River
Owl Creek
Parachute Creek
Pawnee Creek 1,875 km2 (724 mi2)
Piceance Creek 1,630 km2 (629 mi2)
Piedra River 1,770 km2 (683 mi2)
Piney River
Plateau Creek
Plum Creek
Purgatoire River 8,923 km2 (3,445 mi2)
Quartz Creek
Ralston Creek
Rio Blanco
Rio Chama 8,204 km2 (3,168 mi2)
Rio Chamita
Rio de los Piños
Rio Grande 457,275 km2 (176,555 mi2)
Rio Lado
Rio San Antonio
Roan Creek
Roaring Fork Little Snake River
Roaring Fork River 3,766 km2 (1,454 mi2)
Roaring River
Rush Creek 3,570 km2 (1,378 mi2)
Saguache Creek 3,482 km2 (1,345 mi2)
Saint Charles River
Saint Louis Creek
Saint Vrain Creek 2,572 km2 (993 mi2)
San Juan River 64,560 km2 (24,927 mi2)
San Luis Creek 7,000 km2 (2,703 mi2)
San Miguel River 4,060 km2 (1,567 mi2)
Sand Arroyo Creek 1,938 km2 (748 mi2)
Sand Creek (Adams County)
Sand Creek (Colorado Springs)
Sand Creek (Larimer County)
Sangre de Cristo Creek (Costilla County)
Sidney Draw 1,949 km2 (753 mi2)
Slate River
Smith Fork
Smoky Hill River 51,783 km2 (19,994 mi2)
Snake River
South Arkansas River
South Fork Animas River
South Fork Beaver Creek 1,939 km2 (749 mi2)
South Fork Cache la Poudre River
South Fork Canadian River
South Fork Conejos River
South Fork Crystal River
South Fork Cucharas River
South Fork Eagle River
South Fork Elk River
South Fork Fryingpan River
South Fork Huerfano River
South Fork Little Snake River
South Fork Michigan River
South Fork Piney River
South Fork Purgatoire River
South Fork Republican River 7,195 km2 (2,778 mi2)
South Fork Rio Grande
South Fork San Miguel River
South Fork South Platte River
South Fork Swan River
South Fork West Mancos River
South Fork White River
South Platte River 62,738 km2 (24,223 mi2)
Spring Creek
Spruce Creek
Stoner Creek
Swan River
Tarryall Creek
Taylor River 1,258 km2 (486 mi2)
Tenmile Creek
Tennessee Creek
Tomichi Creek 2,874 km2 (1,109 mi2)
Trinchera Creek
Two Butte Creek 2,107 km2 (814 mi2)
Uncompahgre River 2,921 km2 (1,128 mi2)
Vermillion Creek 2,500 km2 (965 mi2)
West Branch Laramie River
West Dolores River
West Fork Animas River
West Fork Cimarron River
West Fork East Fork Williams Fork
West Fork Elk River
West Fork Encampment River
West Fork Little Thompson River
West Fork North Fork Purgatoire River
West Fork Rio Chama
West Fork San Juan River
West Mancos River
White River 12,989 km2 (5,015 mi2)
White Woman Creek 3,000 km2 (1,158 mi2)
Williams Fork (Colorado River tributary)
Williams Fork (Yampa River tributary)
Willow Creek
Wind River
Wolf Creek
Yampa River 21,506 km2 (8,304 mi2)
Yellow Creek 760 km2 (293 mi2)

Notes
Of the 158 named rivers that flow through the State of Colorado, all but the Green River and Cimarron River have their headwaters in that state.

As of February 1, 2008, the U.S. Board on Geographic Names had identified 5,564 natural streams in the State of Colorado.  Of this number, 147 larger streams (2.6%) were named river and 11 (0.2%) were named rio.  The vast majority of the Colorado streams (5082 or 91.3%) were named creek.  Of the remaining Colorado streams, 122 (2.2%) were named arroyo, 60 (1.1%) were named wash, 44 (0.8%) were named fork, 18 (0.3%) were named branch, 17 (0.3%) were named brook, 17 (0.3%) were named run, 15 (0.3%) were named rito, 10 (0.2%) were named slough, but not a single stream was named stream.  Perhaps the most unusual river name in Colorado belongs to the West Fork East Fork Williams Fork located in Garfield County.

Many streams in Colorado share a name with another stream in the same state.  In addition to the Canadian River that is the largest tributary of the Arkansas River, there is also a Canadian River that is a tributary of the North Platte River.  In addition to the Cimarron River that is another major tributary of the Arkansas River, there is also a Cimarron River that is a tributary of the Gunnison River.  There is a Fall River that is a tributary of the Big Thompson River as well as a Fall River that is a tributary of Clear Creek.

There are 72 streams in the State of Colorado that are named Willow Creek, 71 streams named Spring Creek, 53 streams named Cottonwood Creek, 49 streams named Bear Creek, 49 streams named Beaver Creek, 48 streams named Dry Creek, 33 streams named Rock Creek, 33 streams named Sand Creek, and 32 streams named Mill Creek.  The Arkansas River and the Colorado River flow through Colorado, as do a Florida River, an Idaho Creek, an Illinois River, an Indiana Creek, a Maryland Creek, a Michigan River, a Minnesota Creek, six Missouri Creeks, a Montana Creek, two New York Creeks, two Ohio Creeks, two Pennsylvania Creeks, two Tennessee Creeks, seven Texas Creeks, and a Virginia Creek.

Tributary chart

The following tributary chart shows many important streams that flow through the State of Colorado including all 158 named rivers.  The chart is arranged by tributary and area of the drainage basin.  The names of the 17 Colorado rivers with a drainage basin of more than 10,000 square kilometers (3,900 sq mi) are shown in bold.  Oceans and streams outside of Colorado are shown in italics.

Pacific Ocean
Gulf of California
Colorado River
Green River
Yampa River 21,506 km2 (8,304 mi2)
Little Snake River 10,629 km2 (4,104 mi2)
Roaring Fork Little Snake River
Middle Fork Little Snake River
North Fork Little Snake River
South Fork Little Snake River
Bear River
Elk River
South Fork Elk River
Middle Fork Elk River
North Fork Elk River
Williams Fork
East Fork Williams Fork
White River 12,989 km2 (5,015 mi2)
Piceance Creek 1,630 km2 (629 mi2)
Yellow Creek 760 km2 (293 mi2)
North Fork White River
South Fork White River
Vermillion Creek 2,500 km2 (965 mi2)
upper Colorado River, formerly the Grand River
Gunnison River 20,851 km2 (8,051 mi2)
Uncompahgre River 2,921 km2 (1,128 mi2)
Tomichi Creek 2,874 km2 (1,109 mi2)
Cochetopa Creek
Quartz Creek
Cebolla Creek
North Fork Gunnison River 2,492 km2 (962 mi2)
Smith Fork
Blue Creek
Lake Fork Gunnison River
Henson Creek
Taylor River 1,258 km2 (486 mi2)
East River 762 km2 (294 mi2)
Slate River
Cimarron River
Little Cimarron River
East Fork Little Cimarron River
East Fork Cimarron River
Middle Fork Cimarron River
West Fork Cimarron River
Dolores River 11,998 km2 (4,633 mi2)
San Miguel River 4,060 km2 (1,567 mi2)
South Fork San Miguel River
West Dolores River
Rio Lado
Roaring Fork River 3,766 km2 (1,454 mi2)
Crystal River
North Fork Crystal River
South Fork Crystal River
East Fork South Fork Crystal River
Fryingpan River
North Fork Fryingpan River
South Fork Fryingpan River
Eagle River 2,515 km2 (971 mi2)
Gore Creek
East Fork Eagle River
South Fork Eagle River
Blue River 1,770 km2 (683 mi2)
Snake River
North Fork Snake River
Tenmile Creek
Swan River
Middle Fork Swan River
North Fork Swan River
South Fork Swan River
Little Dolores River
Fraser River
Saint Louis Creek
Williams Fork
East Fork Williams Fork
West Fork East Fork Williams Fork
Piney River
North Fork Piney River
South Fork Piney River
First Fork South Fork Piney River
Parachute Creek
Roan Creek
Plateau Creek
Muddy Creek
Willow Creek
San Juan River 64,560 km2 (24,927 mi2)
Animas River 3,562 km2 (1,375 mi2)
Hermosa Creek
Florida River
North Fork Animas River
South Fork Animas River
West Fork Animas River
Montezuma Creek 3,044 km2 (1,175 mi2)
Mancos River 2,099 km2 (810 mi2)
East Mancos River
Middle Mancos River
West Mancos River
North Fork West Mancos River
South Fork West Mancos River
McElmo Creek 1,842 km2 (711 mi2)
Piedra River 1,770 km2 (683 mi2)
First Fork Piedra River
East Fork Piedra River
Middle Fork Piedra River
La Plata River
Navajo River
Little Navajo River
East Fork Navajo River
Los Pinos River
North Fork Los Pinos River
Rio Blanco
East Fork San Juan River
West Fork San Juan River
Wolf Creek

Atlantic Ocean
Gulf of Mexico
Mississippi River
Missouri River
Platte River
North Platte River 80,755 km2 (31,180 mi2)
Laramie River 11,961 km2 (4,618 mi2)
Sand Creek
West Branch Laramie River
North Fork West Branch Laramie River
Encampment River
West Fork Encampment River
Canadian River
North Fork Canadian River
South Fork Canadian River
Michigan River
Illinois River
North Fork Michigan River
South Fork Michigan River
Dry Fork Michigan River
North Fork North Platte River
South Platte River 62,738 km2 (24,223 mi2)
Lodgepole Creek 8,374 km2 (3,233 mi2)
Cache la Poudre River 4,959 km2 (1,915 mi2)
North Fork Cache la Poudre River
South Fork Cache la Poudre River
Spring Creek
Crow Creek 3,717 km2 (1,435 mi2)
Bijou Creek 3,612 km2 (1,395 mi2)
Beaver Creek 2,939 km2 (1,135 mi2)
Saint Vrain Creek 2,572 km2 (993 mi2)
Boulder Creek 1,160 km2 (448 mi2)
Left Hand Creek
Big Thompson River 2,149 km2 (830 mi2)
Little Thompson River
North Fork Little Thompson River
West Fork Little Thompson River
Fall River
Roaring River
North Fork Big Thompson River
Aspen Brook
Wind River
Spruce Creek
Hidden River
Fish Creek
Sidney Draw 1,949 km2 (753 mi2)
Box Elder Creek
Kiowa Creek 1,888 km2 (729 mi2)
Pawnee Creek 1,875 km2 (724 mi2)
Clear Creek 1,497 km2 (578 mi2)
Ralston Creek
Fall River
Cherry Creek 1,050 km2 (405 mi2)
Plum Creek
North Fork South Platte River
Geneva Creek
Middle Fork South Platte River
South Fork South Platte River
Lone Tree Creek
Owl Creek
Tarryall Creek
Sand Creek
Bear Creek 339 km2 (131 mi2)
Big Dry Creek (Littleton, Colorado)
Big Dry Creek (Westminster, Colorado)
Little Dry Creek
Kansas River
Republican River
North Fork Republican River 13,172 km2 (5,086 mi2)
Arikaree River 4,429 km2 (1,710 mi2)
North Fork Arikaree River
Frenchman Creek 7,398 km2 (2,856 mi2)
Sappa Creek
Beaver Creek
South Fork Beaver Creek 1,939 km2 (749 mi2)
Little Beaver Creek 1,602 km2 (619 mi2)
South Fork Republican River 7,195 km2 (2,778 mi2)
Smoky Hill River 51,783 km2 (19,994 mi2)
Ladder Creek 3,645 km2 (1,407 mi2)
North Fork Smoky Hill River 1,965 km2 (759 mi2)
Arkansas River 478,501 km2 (184,750 mi2)
Tennessee Creek
Canadian River 122,701 km2 (47,375 mi2)
Vermejo River
North Fork Vermejo River
Cimarron River 44,890 km2 (17,332 mi2)
North Fork Cimarron River 4,462 km2 (1,723 mi2)
Sand Arroyo Creek 1,938 km2 (748 mi2)
Purgatoire River 8,923 km2 (3,445 mi2)
North Fork Purgatoire River
West Fork North Fork Purgatoire River
Middle Fork Purgatoire River
South Fork Purgatoire River
Huerfano River 4,840 km2 (1,869 mi2)
Cucharas River
Hill Branch Cucharas River
South Fork Cucharas River
South Fork Huerfano River
Big Sandy Creek 4,825 km2 (1,863 mi2)
Rush Creek 3,570 km2 (1,378 mi2)
Horse Creek 3,680 km2 (1,421 mi2)
Apishapa River 2,798 km2 (1,080 mi2)
North Fork Apishapa River
Fountain Creek 2,418 km2 (933 mi2)
Two Butte Creek 2,107 km2 (814 mi2)
Chico Creek 1,934 km2 (747 mi2)
South Arkansas River
Middle Fork South Arkansas River
North Fork South Arkansas River
Grape Creek
Saint Charles River
North Saint Charles River
East Fork Arkansas River
Chalk Creek
Bear Creek Basin (endorheic basin)
Bear Creek 4,500 km2 (1,737 mi2)
White Woman Basin (endorheic basin)
White Woman Creek 3,000 km2 (1,158 mi2)
Rio Grande 457,275 km2 (176,555 mi2)
Rio Chama 8,204 km2 (3,168 mi2)
Rio Chamita
East Fork Rio Chama
West Fork Rio Chama
Conejos River 2,078 km2 (802 mi2)
Rio San Antonio
Rio de los Piños
North Fork Rio de los Piños
Middle Fork Conejos River
North Branch Conejos River
North Fork Conejos River
South Fork Conejos River
Adams Fork Conejos River
South Fork Rio Grande
Alamosa River 383 km2 (148 mi2)
Trinchera Creek
Sangre de Cristo Creek
San Luis Closed Basin (endorheic basin)
San Luis Creek 7,000 km2 (2,703 mi2)
Saguache Creek 3,482 km2 (1,345 mi2)

See also

Hydrology
Surface-water hydrology
Drainage basin
State of Colorado
Geography of Colorado
Waterfalls of Colorado

References

External links

 State of Colorado website
 Colorado Division of Natural Resources
 Colorado Water Conservation Board
 Colorado Division of Water Resources
 Colorado Geological Survey
 Major Rivers of Colorado
 Colorado's Decision Support Systems

 
Geography of Colorado
Lists of landforms of Colorado
Tourism in Colorado
Colorado, List of rivers of